Brand Highway is a  main highway linking the northern outskirts of Perth to Geraldton in Western Australia. Together with North West Coastal Highway, it forms part of the Western Australian coastal link to the Northern Territory. The highway is a part of Australia's Highway 1, and is for the most part a single carriageway with one lane in each direction.

The highway was completed in 1975 and opened in 1976 being named it in honour of former Premier of Western Australia Sir David Brand. It replaced the Midlands Road from Perth to Dongara.

Route description

The Brand Highway, along with the associated section of National Route 1, begins in Muchea, branching off from a roundabout interchange connecting it to both Great Northern Highway to the north and east and Tonkin Highway to the south. The highway passes through agricultural areas and shrublands, travelling through or near the towns of Gingin, Badgingarra (and Badgingarra National Park), Cataby, Eneabba, Dongara and Greenough. The highway ends after  at the city of Geraldton. National Route 1, and traffic travelling to areas further north of here, continue along North West Coastal Highway towards Port Hedland.

Main Roads Western Australia monitors traffic volume across the state's road network, including various locations along Brand Highway. In the 2012/13 financial year, the recorded traffic volumes ranged from 15,400 vehicles per day north of Olive Street, near Geraldton, down to 1,470 south of Indian Ocean Drive. The highest percentage of heavy vehicles was 36.0% south of Airfield Road, the access road to RAAF Gingin. Reports commissioned by the Royal Automobile Club of Western Australia (RAC) in 2006 and 2008 gave the highway a three-star safety rating out of five. The overall highway network was generally rated as three-star or four-star, with around 10% in 2006 and 5% in 2008 receiving a two-star rating.

Wheatbelt 
While the railway continues north to the town, the highway deviates to the west, continuing north-west through the Wheatbelt. The Brand Highway leaves the Wheatbelt for the Mid West region, continuing its journey north-westwards.

Mid West 
The Brand Highway encounters Eneabba  beyond Badgingarra, and after another  meets the northern end of the coastal road Indian Ocean Drive. The Brand Highway heads west for  into the town, and then follows the coast north and north-westwards. It reaches South Greenough after , where it realigns itself  to the north-east via two 90° curves. The Brand Highway continues north-west, passing through Greenough after , and terminating  further on in Geraldton, at a diamond interchange with North West Coastal Highway. For the last  of its length, the Brand Highway serves as the main road for the southern suburbs of Geraldton, including Wandina, Tarcoola Beach, Mount Tarcoola and Mahomets Flats.

History
Within two years of its formation in 1926, Western Australia's new Main Roads Board became responsible for the state's arterial and trunk roads, which were declared 'main roads' under the Main Roads Act. The main road to Geraldton branched off the Perth–Meekatharra road at Walebing, near Moora, travelled an inland route via Mingenew to Dongara, and then continued north along the coast to Geraldton. A new main road from Perth to Geraldton via Mogumber was proposed in the 1940s, but was rejected by the Minister for Works, who considered the development of parallel routes infeasible given that traffic was light.

Western Australia's Nomenclature Advisory Committee proposed in October 1940 that a highway name, Great Northern Highway, be used to describe the main route from Midland to Geraldton, and extending to areas further north. By July 1941, the committee's proposal had expanded to three highway names for the roads in the state's northern areas: Great Northern Highway for the Midland Junction to Wyndham road, North West Coastal Highway for the road linking Geraldton to Port Hedland and De Grey, and Geraldton Highway for the Walebing–Mingenew–Geraldton route. This road was gazetted as Geraldton Highway on 17 September 1943, superseding the previously used names of Choral Street, Yarma Street, Railway Road, Midland Street, Railway Street and Irwin Road.

From the 1950s, increasing development between Perth and Geraldton saw the planning and establishment of a road network linking Dongara and Gingin – though the roads were not initially intended to become a highway. Early surveying of the roads, in the 1950s, was undertaken from within a light aircraft flying over the area. This was one of the first times in Western Australia that this technique was used. This allowed native wildflowers to survive and flourish on public land, providing aesthetically pleasing and interesting views to reduce road hypnosis and driver fatigue. The road would also be made safer by removing natural roadside obstacles, and replacing them with shrubs and more wildflowers.

Construction of new roads that would eventually be part of the Brand Highway began in 1959. Various segments were completed as the need arose, until in 1975, there was a new link between Perth and Geraldton. On 14 February 1975, the new road was gazetted as part of the Geraldton Highway, with the old route via Moora renamed The Midlands Road. It was officially opened on 4 April 1975 by the Minister for Transport, Ray O'Connor at Eneabba. One year later, the road was named Brand Highway after Sir David Brand, who was Premier of Western Australia from 1959 to 1971 and also held the local electorate of Greenough from 1945 to 1975. The change of name from Geraldton Highway to Brand Highway was gazetted on 12 March 1976. Premier Charles Court officiated a ceremony held on 30 April 1976 at a tourist information bay in Dongara, where a plaque was unveiled commemorating the naming of the highway.

The northern end of Brand Highway was upgraded as part of Stage 1 of the Geraldton Southern Transport Corridor, the biggest individual project in the early 2000s across all of rural Western Australia. The project, constructed between March 2004 and December 2005 at a cost of $92.5 million, involved the relocation of railway tracks,  worth of road works, and grade separation of roads. Brand Highway's northern terminus at North West Coastal Highway was upgraded from a roundabout to an interchange. An overpass was built for nearby Durlacher Street to cross North West Coastal Highway, which was made into a dual carriageway in the vicinity of the interchange. Stage 2 of the project, constructed between December 2008 and December 2009, provided a new single carriageway connection to Geraldton–Mount Magnet Road, with access to Geraldton Airport.

Major intersections

The Midlands Road

While the Geraldton Highway was shifted to a new alignment in 1975, the old route, renamed The Midlands Road, remains a significant part of the road network, with the road included as part of numbered road routes.

The Midlands Road, also known as Midlands Road, is a  road in the Mid West and Wheatbelt regions of Western Australia. From Great Northern Highway at Walebing, the road travels west to Moora and then north to Watheroo. The road continues north to Gunyidi, and then travels north-west to Mingenew via Coorow, Carnamah and Three Springs. Beyond Mingenew, it heads west to Dongara, terminating at Brand Highway.

The section from Moora northwards is part of State Route 116, which continues south to Bindoon via Bindoon Moora Road. The section from Walebing to Watheroo National Park is part of Midlands Tourist Way (Tourist Drive 360).

See also

 Highways in Australia
 List of highways in Western Australia

Notes

References

External links

 Main Roads Western Australia

Highways in rural Western Australia
Mid West (Western Australia)
Highway 1 (Australia)